Three steamships of the American President Line were named President Jefferson.

 , launched as Wenatchee 24 May 1919, in service 1921–41, USAT Henry T. Allen and USS Henry T. Allen, reserve fleet as President Jefferson 1946–48
 , in service 1946–70
 , in service until at least 1984

Ship names